"Show Me the Way" (stylized as "Show me the way") is the second single by the four-member Japanese hip-hop group Lead, released on October 17, 2002. It charted better than their debut single, ranking in the top ten on the Oricon charts at #7.

"Show me the way" was the song that helped Lead secure the spot for Best Newcomer during the 44th annual Japan Record Awards at the end of 2002, alongside the band day after tomorrow, Mika Nakashima and Sachika Shino.

Information
"Show me the way" is the second single by Japanese hip-hop group Lead under the Pony Canyon sub-label Flight Master. It debuted higher than their debut single, Manatsu no Magic, breaking the top ten on the Oricon Singles Charts at #7, and it remained on the charts for six consecutive weeks. The success of this single and their previous single helped Lead to win the Best Newcomer award during the 44th Japan Record Awards alongside newbie band day after tomorrow and up-and-coming soloists Mika Nakashima and Sachika Shino.

The single was released as a standard CD, which contained the title track, the b-side "Step by Step" and a remix and instrumental to "Show me the way." While the music video was released for syndication to the public upon the single's release, it was not available for the public to purchase until their DVD/VHS release Lead Movies 1 in September 2003.

"Show me the way" was written and composed by musical composer Yasushi Sasamoto, who is part of the rap unit known as BANANA ICE. While the b-side, "Step by Step", was also composed by Yasushi, the lyrics to the piece were written by Kentaro Akutsu, while KATSU wrote the rap portion of the song. KATSU and Yasushi had previously worked with Lead for their prior single. The remix of "Show me the way" was done by Japanese music group COLDFEET, who debuted in 1998.

"Step by Step" would be given a remix on their debut studio album Life On Da Beat, which was released in April the following year. The remix would be rearranged by Gen Ittetsu, who is most famous for his works with legendary Japanese artist Gackt.

Promotional advertisements
To help promote the single, Lead performed "Show me the way" on the Japanese talk show HEY!HEY!HEY! MUSIC CHAMP.

Along with performing the song, they group appeared on the game show portion later on in the month to boost their notoriety. At the time of their appearances, Hiroki was seventeen, Shinya was fifteen and Keita and Akira were fourteen.

Track listing

Charts

References

External links
 Lead Official Site

2002 singles
2002 songs
Pony Canyon singles
J-pop songs
Lead (band) songs